XVidCap is free software used for recording a screencast or digital recording of an X Window System screen output with an audio narration.

XVidCap is intended to be a standards-based, open-source alternative to commercial software such as Lotus ScreenCam for UNIX platforms and is similar to Camtasia.

Features
XVidCap works using an on-line encoding facility with the FFmpeg libavcodec / libavformat. It can capture any movement on an X11 display either as single frames (like a number of JPEG images) or it can encode the captured frames to a video on-line. It can also grab and embed an audio recording provided users have an OSS compatible system and FFMPEG libraries with compiled audio capture support.

History
Rasca Gmelch developed an early version that was able to capture to individual frames and save them in individual screenshot files. Whilst this approach requires considerable storage, these files could later be converted into a video with tools like transcode. As Rasca had no further time to maintain his code, the project and code was migrated to SourceForge by Karl Beckers where it is currently under development.

References

External links

 
 Instructional videos and FAQ
 How-To Use XVidCap

Screencasting software
Free video software
Free software programmed in C
Video software that uses GTK